Sooküla may refer to several places in Estonia:

Sooküla, Pärnu County, village in Häädemeeste Parish, Pärnu County
Sooküla, Võru County, village in Lasva Parish, Võru County